Champagny-en-Vanoise is a commune in the Savoie department in the Auvergne-Rhône-Alpes region in south-eastern France.
It is also known for the skiing and snow-boarding slopes.

See also
 Friburge
Communes of the Savoie department

References

External links

 Champagny-en-Vanoise tourist office

Communes of Savoie